Tŏktong station is a railway station in Taedae-dong, Waudo-guyŏk, Namp'o Special City, North Korea on the P'yŏngnam Line of the Korean State Railway.

History

Services
Regional passenger trains 226-227/228-229 between Tŏkch'ŏn on the P'yŏngdŏk Line and P'yŏngnam Onch'ŏn, regional trains 225/230 between Pot'onggang and P'yŏngnam Onch'ŏn, and local trains 361/362 between Namp'o on the P'yŏngnam Line and Ch'ŏlgwang on the Ŭllyul Line via the Sŏhae Kammun Line, use this station.

References

Railway stations in North Korea
Railway stations opened in 1938
Buildings and structures in Nampo
1938 establishments in Korea